Mittel U was a class of U-boats built during World War I by the Kaiserliche Marine.

Mittel U U-boats carried 16 torpedoes and had various arrangements of deck guns. Some had only one 88mm gun while others had a single 105mm gun - but most had both originally. In 1917 some of the boats were refitted with a single 105mm gun.

They carried a crew of 39 and had excellent seagoing abilities with a cruising range of around 11,220 miles. Many arrangements from the Mittel U were also seen on the World War II Type IX U-boats when their design work took place 20 years later.

Between 1915 and 1919 46 were built, amongst them U-88 with Walther Schwieger as commander and U-103 with Claus Rücker.

List of Type Mittel U submarines 
There were 46 Type Mittel U submarines commissioned into the Kaiserliche Marine.

 SM U-81
 SM U-82
 SM U-83
 SM U-84
 SM U-85
 SM U-86
 SM U-87
 SM U-88
 SM U-89
 SM U-90
 SM U-91
 SM U-92

 SM U-93
 SM U-94
 SM U-95
 SM U-96
 SM U-97
 SM U-98
 SM U-99
 SM U-100
 SM U-101
 SM U-102
 SM U-103
 SM U-104

 SM U-105
 SM U-106
 SM U-107
 SM U-108
 SM U-109
 SM U-110
 SM U-111
 SM U-112
 SM U-113
 SM U-114
 SM U-135
 SM U-136

 SM U-137
 SM U-138
 SM U-160
 SM U-161
 SM U-162
 SM U-163
 SM U-164
 SM U-165
 SM U-166
 SM U-167

External links

 

Submarine classes
 
World War I submarines of Germany